The 2022–23 season is Crawley Town's 127th year in their history and eighth consecutive season in League Two. Along with the league, the club will also compete in the FA Cup, the EFL Cup and the EFL Trophy. The season covers the period from 1 July 2022  to 30 June 2023.

Background and pre-season
Horsham revealed a friendly with Crawley on 10 May 2022, though this fixture was later cancelled. Sutton Common Rovers did likewise on 17 May, though this fixture was later cancelled. On 22 June, the Reds confirmed their first four pre-season friendlies, against Eastbourne Borough, East Grinstead Town, Charlton Athletic U23s and Aldershot Town. Two days later, a home fixture against Queens Park Rangers was confirmed. An eight addition was added to the schedule, against Three Bridges. A trip to Murcia and a friendly against Qatar SC were announced on 1 July, but the match against Qatar SC was cancelled later that day. the Another match was added to pre-season calendar, against Heart of Midlothian. 

On 20 December, Crawley announced they would travel to the training ground of West Ham United to play a behind-closed-doors friendly against their U21 side.

Competitions

League Two

League table

Matches
On 23 June, the league fixtures were announced.

FA Cup

The Reds were drawn at home to Accrington Stanley in the first round.

EFL Cup

Crawley Town were drawn at home against Bristol Rovers in the first round and to Fulham in the second round.

EFL Trophy

On 20 June, the initial Group stage draw was made, grouping Crawley Town with AFC Wimbledon and Portsmouth. Three days later, Aston Villa U21 joined Southern Group B.

Transfers

Transfers in

Loans in

Transfers out

Loans out

Notes

References

Crawley Town
Crawley Town F.C. seasons